Pandoc is a free-software document converter, widely used as a writing tool (especially by scholars) and as a basis for publishing workflows. It was created by John MacFarlane, a philosophy professor at the University of California, Berkeley.

Functionality 
Pandoc dubs itself a "markup format" converter. It can take a document in one of the supported formats and convert only its markup to another format. Maintaining the look and feel of the document is not a priority.

Plug-ins for custom formats can also be written in Lua, which has been used to create an exporting tool for the Journal Article Tag Suite, for example.

An included CiteProc option allows pandoc to use bibliographic data from reference management software in any of five formats: BibTeX, BibLaTeX, CSL JSON or CSL YAML, or RIS. The information is automatically transformed into a citation in various styles (such as APA, Chicago, or MLA) using an implementation of the Citation Style Language. This allows the program to serve as a simpler alternative to LaTeX for producing academic writing.

Supported file formats

Input formats 

The input format with the most support is an extended version of Markdown. Notwithstanding, pandoc can also read in the following formats:

 Creole
 DocBook
 EPUB
 FictionBook (FB2)
 Haddock
 HTML
 Jira wiki markup
 Journal Article Tag Suite (JATS)
 JSON
 LaTeX
 Lightweight markup language
 man
 Markdown: Strict, CommonMark, GitHub Flavored Markdown (GFM), MultiMarkdown (MMD) and Markdown Extra (PHP Extra) variants
 OpenDocument (ODT)
 OPML
 Office Open XML: Microsoft Word variant
 Org-mode
 reStructuredText
 Textile
 txt2tags (t2t)
 Wiki markup: MediaWiki, Muse, TikiWiki, TWiki and Vimwiki variants

Output formats 

Pandoc can create files in the following output formats, which are not necessarily the same set of formats as the input formats:

 AsciiDoc
 ConTeXt
 DocBook: Versions 4 and 5
 EPUB: Versions 2 and 3
 FictionBook (FB2)
 Haddock
 HTML: HTML4 and HTML5 variants, respectively compliant with XHTML 1.0 Transitional and XHTML Strict
 InDesign ICML
 Jira wiki markup
 Journal Article Tag Suite (JATS)
 JSON
 LaTeX
 man
 Markdown: Strict, CommonMark, GitHub Flavored Markdown (GFM), MultiMarkdown (MMD) and Markdown Extra (PHP Extra) variants
 OpenDocument (ODT/ODF)
 OPML
 Office Open XML: Microsoft Word and Microsoft PowerPoint variants
 Org-mode
 PDF (needs a third-party add-on like ConTeXt, pdfroff, wkhtmltopdf, weasyprint or prince)
 Plain text
 reStructuredText
 Rich Text Format (RTF)
 TEI
 Texinfo
 Textile
 Web-based slideshows: LaTeX Beamer, Slideous, Slidy, DZSlides, reveal.js and S5 variants 
 Wiki markup: DokuWiki, MediaWiki, Muse, TikiWiki, TWiki and Vimwiki variants

See also 

 Round-trip format conversion
 Help authoring tool

References

External links 

 

2006 software
File conversion software
Free software programmed in Haskell
Lightweight markup languages
Lua (programming language)-scriptable software
Technical communication tools
Workflow applications